Anarshirin or Anar-e Shirin may refer to:
 Anarshirin, Hormozgan
 Anar-e Shirin 3, Kerman Province